Ann Elizabeth Galbally  (born 1945) is an Australian art historian and academic.

Education and career 
Galbally was born in Victoria in 1945, daughter of Sheila Marie (née Kenny) and Labor Party politician, John William Galbally. She graduated from the University of Melbourne with BA Hons (English and Fine Arts) in 1966, an MA  in 1970 and a PhD in 1975.

In the 1970s she was an art critic for The Age newspaper. In 1977–78, while senior lecturer at the University of Melbourne, Galbally curated an exhibition of 60 artworks by Australian impressionist John Peter Russell which opened at the Van Gogh Museum in Amsterdam and then toured to Sydney, Melbourne and Adelaide.

Awards and recognition 
Galbally was elected Fellow of the Australian Academy of the Humanities in 1989. She was appointed a Member of the Order of Australia in the 2008 Australia Day Honours for "service to the arts as an academic, historian and researcher, particularly through the preservation, development and promotion of Australian art history, as a mentor and author".

She won The Age Book of the Year Non-Fiction Prize for Charles Conder: The last Bohemian in 2003 and her book, A Remarkable Friendship, was shortlisted for the 2010 Magarey Medal for Biography.

Works

References 

1945 births
Living people
University of Melbourne alumni
Academic staff of the University of Melbourne
Australian art historians
Members of the Order of Australia
Fellows of the Australian Academy of the Humanities
20th-century Australian women